Kids Operating Room aka KidsOR is a Scottish charity founded by Garreth and Nicola Wood in 2018. The charity install paediatric Operating Rooms in low- and middle-income countries with the aim of bringing access to safe surgery to every child who needs it. Based in Scotland, KidsOR have shipped and installed theatres to over 20 countries across Africa, Latin America and Asia.

History 

The charity was founded by Nicola and Garreth Wood in 2018 with the aim of creating access to safe surgery for children across the world. Having become aware of the critical lack of resources for paediatric surgery across the world, Kids Operating Room was established to meet this need, and provide low- and middle-income countries with improved capacity for children's surgery. Based in Scotland, the charity's model focuses on equipping and up-skilling local teams, providing them with state-of-the-art facilities, equipment and training, to allow them to care for the children of their country for years to come with little need for intervention. In just 5 years since its official launch, the charity identified that it had created capacity for more than 80,000 paediatric operations.

In 2021, Kids Operating Room opened the world's first dedicated paediatric Operating Room in a refugee camp in Kakuma, Kenya.

The charity's base for operations is in Dundee, where the team ship entire Operating Rooms, which consists of more than 3,000 items of equipment, across the world.

References 

Charities based in Edinburgh
2018 establishments in Scotland
Organizations established in 2018
Children's charities based in Scotland
Foreign charities operating in Kenya
Foreign charities operating in Nigeria